NavGujarat Samay is a Gujarati language broadsheet daily newspaper from The Times Group. It was launched in Ahmedabad, India on 16 January 2014 to cater to vernacular language readers of Gujarat. Later, The Times Group formed joint venture Shayona Times Private Limited with Suresh Patel-owned Shayona Group, which is engaged in construction activity in Ahmedabad.

References

External Links
 Official Website
 Official Epaper

Publications established in 2014
Gujarati-language newspapers published in India
Daily newspapers published in India
Publications of The Times Group
2014 establishments in Gujarat
Newspapers published in Gujarat